The 17411/17412 Mahalaxmi Express is an express train belonging to Indian Railways that runs between Mumbai and Kolhapur in India. It is a daily service. It operates as train number 17411 from Mumbai CSMT to Kolhapur SCSMT and as train number 17412 in the reverse direction. Before gauge conversion, this train ran in two sections, with Sectional Carriage interchanged at Pune & later at Miraj, with timeline

 Bombay-Pune (as 303 Mumbai–Pune Mail 1863-1971), Bombay-Miraj (as 303 Bombay Mail 1971-1974), Bombay-Kolhapur (as 303 Mahalaxmi Express since 1974)
 902 Poona Mail (MG Service between Pune-Miraj & later Pune-Bangalore till 1974), 304 Bombay Mail (MG Service Miraj-Bangalore past 1971-73) & 304 Mahalaxmi Express (MG Service since 1974 till Miraj-Bangalore GC)

After gauge conversion, the Miraj–Bangalore train was discontinued and a new direct train between Kurla and Bangalore was introduced. It is named after Mahalakshmi temple in Kolhapur.

Coaches
The 17411/7412 Mahalaxmi Express presently has 1 AC 1st Class cum AC 2 tier, 1 AC 2 tier, 2 AC 3 tier, 13 Sleeper Class & 4 General Unreserved coaches. As with most train services in India, coach composition may be amended at the discretion of Indian Railways depending on demand.

Service
Mumbai CSMT–Kolhapur SCSMT Mahalaxmi Express was introduced in 1971. Passengers were transferred from slip coaches of Bengaluru Miraj Express to Mahalaxmi Express at Miraj Junction. After gauge conversion, Bengaluru–Miraj slip Express was discontinued and Kurla–Bengaluru Express was introduced.

Now 17411 Mahalaxmi Express covers the distance of 518 kilometres in 11 hours 05 mins (47.31 km/hr) & 11 hours 05 mins as 17412 Mahalaxmi Express (47.45 km/hr).

As its average speed in both directions is below 55 km/hr as per Indian Railways rules, it does not have an Express surcharge.

Traction
Dual-traction WCAM-2/2P or WCAM-3 locos haul the train from Mumbai CST until  after which a Pune-based WDM-3A or WDP-4 takes over until Kolhapur.

Incident
On 27 July 2019, 17411 Mahalaxmi Express was stuck between Badlapur Station & Vangani station for 12–15 hours after heavy rains & flooding from nearby Ulhas River. Approx 1050 passengers  including 9 pregnant women were rescued by NDRF, Indian Navy, Indian Air Force, Maharashtra Police and local people of Vangani.

See also
 Koyna Express
 Sahyadri Express

References

External links 
https://web.archive.org/web/20160314234300/http://enquiry.indianrail.gov.in/ntes/

Transport in Mumbai
Transport in Kolhapur
Named passenger trains of India
Rail transport in Maharashtra
Railway services introduced in 1971
Express trains in India